Ed Dueim (Arabic الدويم, also Romanized as ad-Duwaym, Ad Douiem, Al Dewaym, Dewaim etc.) is one of the largest cities along the White Nile in Sudan.

Ed Dueim is on the west bank of the White Nile, between Khartoum and Kosti.
It is home to the University of Bakht, which lies to the north of the town.
The university has played an important role in promoting education throughout Sudan. It is known for its two-year course called Al Sanatain, which prepared teachers to teach school, attracting students from all regions of Sudan and neighbouring countries.

Climate
Ed Dueim has a hot desert climate (Köppen climate classification BWh).

See also

Education in Sudan
Ed Dueim Airport

References

Populated places in White Nile (state)